Leonardo, The International Society for the Arts, Sciences and Technology (Leonardo/ISAST) is a registered 501(c)(3) nonprofit formed in 1982 as an umbrella organization for the journals Leonardo and the Leonardo Music Journal. In 2018, Leonardo/ISAST was awarded the Golden Nica Prix Ars Electronica as Visionary Pioneers of New Media Art.

History
Leonardo/ISAST was founded by physicist Roger Malina, son of the Leonardo journal's founder, astronautical pioneer and artist Frank Malina. With the support of founding board members like Frank Oppenheimer, the International Society for the Arts, Sciences and Technology (Leonardo/ISAST) was formed in 1982. The name "Leonardo" was inspired by Leonardo da Vinci, due to his contributions to art, science, and technological progress.

Publications
Leonardo/ISAST aims include to provide international education and charitable assistance to artists; promote and develop the interaction of artists, scientists, and engineers through conferences, exhibitions, workshops, seminars and other events.

Publications of ISAST include the following, published through The MIT Press:
Leonardo
Leonardo Music Journal
 Leonardo Electronic Almanac, editor-in-chief Lanfranco Aceti
 Leonardo Book Series, editor-in-chief Sean Cubitt
 Leonardo Reviews, editor-in-chief Michael Punt
Programs of ISAST include:
 Leonardo ABstracts Service (LABS), editor-in-chief Sheila Pinkel
 LASER (Leonardo Art Science Evening Rendezvous) international speaker series chaired by Piero Scaruffi
 Scientific Delirium Madness artist-scientist residency with Djerassi Artists Residency Program
 Leonardo Education and Art Forum (LEAF), chaired by Ruth West; past chairs include Patricia Olynyk and Ellen Levy.

Governance
Leonardo/ISAST is currently governed by Marc Hebert, Raphael Arar, Michael Bennett, Alan Boldon, Nina Czegledy, Adiraj Gupta, Minu Ipe, Gordon Knox, Roger Malina, Joel Slayton, Timothy Summers, Darlene Tong, and Sha Xin Wei.

References 

Charities based in California
Cultural organizations based in California
1982 establishments in California
Organizations established in 1982

External links
Official website
Leonardo Education and Art Forum
501(c)(3) organizations